Copablepharon robertsoni is a species of cutworm or dart moth in the family Noctuidae. It is found in North America.

The MONA or Hodges number for Copablepharon robertsoni is 10687.1.

References

Further reading

External links

 

Noctuinae